Ron del Barrilito is the oldest Puerto Rican rum brand still in production. Since 1880, it has been made by the Fernández family at Hacienda Santa Ana in Bayamón, Puerto Rico.

History

Origins 
Hacienda Santa Ana's origins date back to Fernando Fernández. A native of Santander, Spain, Fernández came to Puerto Rico in 1787. He was bestowed large tracts of farmland located along Puerto Rico's northern coast, mostly used for growing sugarcane, one of the island's largest crops in that era.

Fernando Fernández had two sons: José Ramón and Manuel. José Ramón, the oldest, inherited Hacienda La Esperanza in the town of Manatí, Puerto Rico. Manuel, the youngest, was left in charge of Hacienda Santa Ana in Bayamón.

Beginning of rum production 

Rum production at Hacienda Santa Ana's started during the family's third generation in Puerto Rico. During the mid 1860s, Pedro Fernández, one of Manuel's sons, went away to study engineering in France, where he developed an interest in the production of brandies and cognacs.

Upon his return to Puerto Rico in 1871, taking a cue from the European custom of families producing their own liquors for their personal use and to entertain visitors, Pedro started producing rum.

Although the rum was initially produced for private consumption, word started spreading amongst the Hacienda's frequent visitors that the rum produced by Pedro Fernández at Santa Ana was truly exceptional. The story goes that the rum was kept in a barrel at the Hacienda and that, whenever Pedro Fernández asked his visitors if they would care for a drink, more often than not, they asked for some “rum from the small barrel” or, more endearingly in Spanish “ron del barrilito”, so in 1880, when Pedro Fernández decided to start selling rum, he used this phrase as the brand name. The name Ron del Barrilito, as well as the rum it describes and the label that distinguishes it, have remained unchanged since 1880.

Next generations 

In the early twentieth century, Edmundo Fernández, one of Pedro's sons, would follow in his father's footsteps as Ron del Barrilito's master blender. The century started with tremendous challenges for the family business. Puerto Rico, by then a territory of the United States, was subject to the 1920 Prohibition Amendment, which made it illegal to produce and sell alcoholic beverages anywhere in the country. Ron del Barrilito, as well as every other liquor and spirits manufacturer in the United States, had to cease operations immediately.

In 1933, when the Prohibition Era ended, Edmundo Fernández resumed production and introduced the first new product Ron del Barrilito had made in decades. The blend first commercialized by Pedro Fernández in 1880 is what today is known as Ron del Barrilito Tres Estrellas (“Three Stars”), but after Prohibition, Edmundo Fernández saw an opportunity to craft a younger rum, called Ron del Barrilito Dos Estrellas (“Two Stars”).

Throughout the rest of the twentieth century and into the twenty-first century, Edmundo's children and grandchildren continued to produce Ron del Barrilito, and  Ron del Barrilito is still made at Hacienda Santa Ana using the same formula and in small batches.

Hacienda Santa Ana is home to some of the oldest aging rum stocks in the Caribbean. One such example is “La Doña,” also known as the "Freedom Barrel", a barrel that was filled and laid to age in 1952 by Edmundo Fernández with instructions that it should only be opened when Puerto Rico becomes independent, and it would be placed in the town's square for folks to have a free shot from it. Over a century later, the barrel remains unopened and serves as symbol of national pride and family heritage.

Methods 
Much of Ron del Barrilito's formula remains a closely guarded family secret, apart from the fact that it is aged in vintage white oak barrels that previously held “oloroso” sherry, and that no artificial flavorings or colorings are used in the process.

Packaging 
Ron del Barrilito's iconic label has remained virtually unchanged since the late nineteenth century. The medals on the main label's upper segment were awarded for quality during various Expositions across the United States in the early twentieth century.

The star-based denomination is another takeaway that Pedro Fernández learned from French brandy making. It was common practice in France at that time to use stars to show the quality of a particular brandy.

Varieties 
The original Ron del Barrilito is known today as Ron del Barrilito Tres Estrellas (“Three Stars”). It is a blend of rums aged between 6 and 10 years.

Ron del Barrilito Dos Estrellas (“Two Stars”) is a younger rum better suited for everyday drinking. Dos Estrellas is aged between 3 and 5 years.

In 2018, Ron del Barrilito launched a limited edition production of Ron del Barrilito Cinco Estrellas (“Five Stars”), a blend of rums aged up to 35 years.

Ron del Barrilito Cuatro Estrellas (”Four Stars”) is aged up to 20 years and only available at their visitor center where customers can fill and seal their own bottle.

All Ron del Barrilito rums are 43% Alcohol by Volume (86 Proof).

References

External links
 Francisco Oller, Puerto Rican impressionist artist painted Hacienda La Esperanza

Alcoholic drink companies
Puerto Rican brands